Neste Oyj (international name: Neste Corporation; former names Neste Oil Corporation and Fortum Oil and Gas Oy) is an oil refining and marketing company located in Espoo, Finland. It produces, refines and markets oil products, provides engineering services, and licenses production technologies. Neste has operations in 14 countries.

Neste shares are listed on the NASDAQ OMX Helsinki Stock Exchange. As of 2022, the Prime Minister's Office of Finland is the largest shareholder in the company, owning 35.91% of shares. 

In 2021, Neste was the third largest company in Finland in terms of revenue.

The name "Neste" means "liquid" in Finnish.

History

1948–1997 (Neste)

Neste was founded in 1948 as the State petrol company of Finland with the purpose to ensure the availability of refined fuels in Finland. The company's headquarters was established in Espoo. At the time, there was no oil industry or related expertise in Finland, and the company had to start operations from scratch.

In 1955, Uolevi Raade became the company's CEO. In 1957, the first oil refinery in Finland was built at Naantali using US technology. The Porvoo refinery was built in 1965 in Sköldvik (Kilpilahti). Originally, much of the oil refined was of Soviet origin, though North Sea oil was used after the collapse of the USSR.

In the 1960s and 1970s, Neste became the largest company in Finland. In addition to oil refining, Neste began exploring and producing oil and gas and entered into the chemical industry. During the Cold War, Finland imported goods from the Soviet Union in order to retain exporting privileges to the country. Towards this end, Finland imported Russian oil, which was refined by Neste.

In 1971, Neste acquired half of Kesko-owned Kesoil.

In the 1970s, Neste's fleet constituted one third of Finland's merchant fleet in terms of its load capacity (1.1 million deadweight tons). Neste Shipping's largest tankers were the 114,000-dwt sister vessels Tiiskeri (1969) and Enskeri (1970), and the 259,000-dwt vessels Jaarli, Jatuli and Jurmo, all of which were built at the beginning of the decade and bought second-hand in 1979. Because of the operations of Neste, the oil crisis of 1973 had little effect in Finland.

In 1976, Finland's first skyscraper, Neste's 83.6-meter tall headquarters, was built in Keilaniemi, Espoo. It was built in Espoo because Helsinki did not issue a building license for such a tall building.

In 1980, Jaakko Ihamuotila became the CEO.

Neste started its service station operations in 1983.

Neste held a legal import monopoly until the market liberalization in the 1990s. In 1990, Neste's international oil trade accounted for about half of its turnover and oil refining for a quarter. In 1991, the company's turnover stood at 53.025 billion Finnish markka, and it employed around 13,685 people. After the Soviet Union collapsed in 1991, the supply of oil from the region also dropped, and Neste had to find new sources of raw material. Neste had built several chemical plants around Europe, but as the prices of oil and chemical products plummeted, Neste decided to sell off its chemical industry operations.

In 1991, Neste became the majority owner of Finnoil. Kesoil also became a wholly owned subsidiary. In 1992, Union service stations became Neste service stations. The following year the same happened to Finnoil service stations.

In 1994, Gasum was established with Gazprom as a minor (25%) shareholder. In 1994, Neste's polyolefin production was separated into Borealis, a joint venture with the Norwegian Statoil. In 1998, Neste's 50% stake in Borealis was sold to OMV and IPIC.

In 1994, Neste began as the main sponsor of a competition previously known as the Finnish Rally and renamed Neste Rally Finland. In October 2020, Neste ended its 26-year title sponsorship.

In November 1995, the company was listed on the main list of the Helsinki Stock Exchange.

1998–2005 (Neste as part of Fortum)

In 1998, Neste merged with the power company Imatran Voima Oy to create Fortum Oyj. After the merger the chemical operations of Neste were transferred to the newly established company Neste Chemicals, which was sold to the investment firm Industri Kapital for $535 million. In 1998, Kesoil service stations also became Neste stations.

An engineering joint venture, Neste Jacobs Oy, was established with the American Jacobs Engineering in 2004. In May 2004, Fortum Oil and Gas Corporation was split into two: the company's oil business was renamed Fortum Oil Corporation and other operations renamed Fortum Heat and Gas Corporation. Fortum Oil Corporation was a subsidiary of Fortum Corporation.

2005–2014 (Neste Oil)
In the spring of 2005, Fortum Oil Corporation was demerged from Fortum, becoming the Neste Oil Corporation.

Neste Oil Corporation was listed on the Helsinki Stock Exchange in June 2005. Risto Rinne started as Ihamuotila's successor and CEO.

A renewable diesel plant, using second generation biofuels and NEXBTL technology and located at the Porvoo refinery, was brought on stream in 2007, together with a new conventional diesel production line. At the same year, the entire bus fleet of Helsinki Region Transport switched fully to diesel produced using NEXBTL technology. Experiments by Neste, VTT Technical Research Centre of Finland and Proventia showed that local emissions decreased significantly after the switch, with overal particle emissions decreasing by 30% and nitrogen oxide emissions by 10%, with excellent winter performance and no problems with catalytic converters. A second renewable diesel plant at Porvoo was became operational in 2009.

In 2007, Neste started a research program on algae, but this was discontinued in 2015. In 2019, the research program restarted to investigate the production of aviation fuel from algae and municipal solid waste.

In 2008, Rinne retired, with Matti Lievonen succeeding him as CEO. In November 2010, Neste launched the world's largest renewable diesel plant, with an annual production capacity of 800,000 tons, in Singapore. The plant used palm oil and other renewable feedstocks as raw materials. Its investment costs were 550 million euros. The use of palm oil was criticized by Greenpeace for its environmental impact. Neste committed to using only sustainably produced palm oil. Neste is a member of the Roundtable on Sustainable Palm Oil (RSPO), an organization established to promote the use of certified palm oil. The organization includes producers, environmental organizations and other NGOs, as well as large palm oil consumers such as Western energy and consumer product companies.

In 2011, a plant similar in size to the Singapore plant was launched in Rotterdam, Netherlands. Its investment costs amounted to 670 million euros.

Neste and Stora Enso ran a joint venture to research the production of renewable diesel oil from wood biomass through biomass gasification and the Fischer-Tropsch process in Varkaus, Finland. However, coming second in a bid for European Investment Bank startup funding led to the cancellation of this project in 2012.

Neste's self-service station chain in Poland was sold to Royal Dutch Shell in April 2013. In the same month, Neste announced that it had started cooperation with The Forest Trust (TFT), an organization that focuses on combating deforestation. During 2013, Neste abandoned its shipping operations; it sold eight vessels (five tankers and three tugboats) owned by Neste Shipping to a shipping company owned by the National Emergency Supply Agency and Ilmarinen Mutual Pension Insurance Company, which began to lease the vessels to Neste. The holding company owns the vessels, which are operated by a separate ship management company. Ensuring supply security was one of Neste's responsibilities. However, this was at odds with the company's operations in the international market. After the change of ownership, the vessels continued to employ a Finnish crew and sail under the Finnish flag. Neste Oil kept three tankers as well as ships owned on a fifty-fifty basis with Swedish company Stena, which it intends to sell later. These ships were not needed to ensure supply security.

2015–2019 (Neste) 
In 2015 the company's name was changed from Neste Oil back to Neste to emphasize the company's focus on the renewable energy business. In 2016, the Neste Oil chain of service stations also shortened its name. The Neste chain included nearly 800 stations in Finland, as well as 258 stations in the Baltics and several in the Saint Petersburg region in Russia.

In 2017, Neste acquired Jacobs Engineering's 40% stake in Neste Jacobs and gained full control of the company. After the takeover, Neste Jacobs was renamed Neste Engineering Solutions Oy.

When CEO Lievonen retired in November 2018, he was followed by the Belgian-German Peter Vanacker. In December, Neste announced an investment decision of around 1.4 billion euros in Singapore, which would increase its total capacity of renewable products in Singapore by 1.3 tonnes per year. It was estimated that the company's total annual production capacity of renewable products would increase to nearly 4.5 million tonnes by 2022.

In February 2019, Neste reported that as of May, it would divide its renewable products business area into three business units and one operating platform, namely Renewable Aviation, Renewable Polymers and Chemicals, Renewable Road Transportation, and Renewables Platform (responsible for managing and developing the production and supply chain of renewable products). In June, Neste and LyondellBasell announced the commercial-scale production of bio-based plastic from renewable materials. In July, Neste sold its chain of service stations in Russia to Tatneft. The deal included a fuel terminal and 75 stations in the Saint Petersburg region. In 2019, Neste was the largest corporate taxpayer in Finland.

2020– (Neste) 

In March 2020, Neste made an investment in the German Sunfire company, which develops high-temperature electrolysis technology. In September, Neste sold its 49.99% stake in Nynas AB to Bitumina Industries. Also in September, Neste started cooperation negotiations concerning the closure of the Naantali refinery because of the decreasing global demand for fossil fuels and the simultaneously increasing overcapacity. The refinery was planned to close by the end of March 2021. The company's aim was to keep its terminal and port operations in Naantali and focus refinery operations in Porvoo. In October, Neste, Covestro, and Borealis started a cooperation for production of polycarbonate plastics. As part of the cooperation, Neste produces hydrocarbons from renewable raw materials as a feedstock to manufacture phenol by Borealis. Phenol is used by Covestro to produce polycarbonate plastics, which would primarily be used for car headlights and window coatings.

In December 2021, CEO Vanacker resigned to become the CEO of LyondellBasell. 

In March 2022, Neste and US-based Marathon Petroleum announced they would form a joint venture in which each will hold half of the shares. The companies planned to invest a total of around 1,800 million euros in upgrading Marathon's refinery in Martinez, California. From the end of the year 2022, the refinery was expected to produce around 2.1 million tonnes of renewable diesel per year. Vanacker continued in his role until April. In May he was followed by Matti Lehmus, who had joined Neste in 1998 and been a member of the executive committee since 2009.

Operations
Neste's operations are divided into marketing and services, oil products, renewable aviation, renewable polymers and chemicals, and renewable road transportation units, as well as managing an operating platform.

Refining

In 2022 Neste operated conventional oil refineries at Porvoo in Finland and renewable diesel refineries in Porvoo, Singapore and Rotterdam, Netherlands.

In 2015, two renewable diesel production lines in Porvoo produced 0.525 million metric tonnes of renewable diesel, which was approximately one fifth of the diesel consumption of Finland. Neste's production facility in Singapore is the largest renewable diesel refinery in the world, with an annual capacity of 1.1 million metric tonnes. A planned new production line is expected to increase its capacity by one million tonnes in 2022.

Neste's refinery feedstock includes of crude oil and renewable raw materials, such as used cooking fat, waste animal and fish fat from the food industry, waste and residues from vegetable oil production, technical corn oil, palm oil, rapeseed oil, and soybean oil. About 80% of renewable feedstock is waste and residue fats and oils. Neste also researches the use of community waste, algae, lignocellulose, and liquefied waste plastic as feedstock.  In 2019, most of the crude oil used by Neste came from Russia.

Neste produces gasolines, diesel, aviation and marine fuels, light and heavy fuel oils, base oils, gasoline components, special fuels and solvents. LPGs, carbon dioxide, and sulfur are sold as by-products. Neste's products include dozens of types of gasoline and more than a hundred end-products. In 2017, Neste was the world's largest producer of renewable diesel, producing 2.6 million tonnes per year.

Neste has developed the proprietary NEXBTL technology for the production of renewable fuels. Renewable diesel is a hydrodeoxygenated paraffinic fuel, which can be used in conventional diesel engines without engine modifications. Neste's sustainable aviation fuel is a drop-in fuel, which can be mixed with kerosene to produce a mixture that contains at least 50% kerosene. Among others, it is used by Lufthansa and the Swedish Air BP. In 2019, Neste produced about 100,000 tonnes of sustainable aviation fuel and plans to produce around 1.5 million tonnes per year by 2023.

Service stations
Neste owns a chain of service stations, which is the largest in Finland. In 2020, Neste had station chains consisting of more than 800 traffic and automatic stations in Finland, Estonia, Latvia and Lithuania. Its service station chain in Finland includes several networks of stations: Neste, Neste K, unmanned Neste Express stations, and the Neste Truck stations for heavy-duty vehicles.

Corporate issues

Shareholding
As of 31 May 2022, the five largest shareholders of Neste were:
Prime Minister's Office (35.91%)
Ilmastorahasto Oy (8.31%)
Varma Mutual Pension Insurance Company (1.34%)
Ilmarinen Mutual Pension Insurance Company (1.28%)
Kela, the Social Insurance Institution of Finland (1.03%)

Recognition
Neste was ranked Finland's most respected service station brand in a survey of Finnish brands carried out by Taloustutkimus and Markkinointi & Mainonta in Summer 2013. 
In February 2014, Talouselämä magazine named Neste's NEXBTL renewable diesel as the most groundbreaking Finnish business innovation of the new millennium. 
Neste was ranked the second most sustainable company in the world on the 2018 Global 100 index ranking by Corporate Knights, a financial information company. In 2019 and 2020 Neste was selected as the third most sustainable company and in 2021 as the fourth most sustainable company in the world in the same index. 
In October 2019, the consulting company Innosight listed Neste as one of the companies that made the most positive changes in their operations. 
Between 2007 and 2019, Neste has been listed in the Dow Jones Sustainability Index (DSJI), which ranks the world's technology companies in terms of their sustainability efforts.

Environmental record

Climate record
Neste has a target to make its production carbon neutral by 2035.

Palm oil
Neste has been criticized for using palm oil and palm fatty acid distillate, a by‐product of physical refining of crude palm oil products, as a part of its feedstock for renewable products. Critics include of WWF, Greenpeace, Biofuelwatch and Milieudefensie, among others.

Neste consumes 1–2% of the world's total palm oil production. In 2016, less than 20% of renewable raw materials used by Neste was crude palm oil. Crude palm oil used by the company has been traceable to the oil palm plantation level since 2007, and has been 100% certified since 2013. However, certification does not apply to palm fatty acid distillate. Since 2016, Neste has published information about all its crude palm oil suppliers on its website.

In 2018 Biofuelwatch stated in their annual report that Neste meets EU sustainability standards for biofuels by sourcing palm oil from older plantations, commonly ones for which rainforest was destroyed before 2008. However, it cannot guarantee that all of its crude palm oil is free of effects from more recent or ongoing deforestation. Greenpeace has issued similar concerns about Neste's palm oil usage after an investigation by MapHubs showed that Neste's supply chain for palm oil includes Indonesian palm mills creating the most orangutan habitat loss.

Neste has been a target of sustained attacks, including publicity campaigns. In January 2011, Neste won the Public Eye Awards. Neste also attempted to shut down a parody website launched by Greenpeace; however, the World Intellectual Property Organization rejected the trademark-based complaint, since the page is noncommercial, gives no economical benefit, is not misleading, and follows the guidelines of freedom of speech.

Used Cooking Oil 
In November 2022, it was announced Neste had acquired the used cooking oil (UCO) collection and aggregation business and related assets in the US from Crimson Renewable Energy Holdings, LLC. The transaction includes shares in SeQuential Environmental Services LLC, and Pure LLC, as well as a UCO processing plant in Salem, Oregon.

See also

Energy in Finland
List of petroleum companies
Social and environmental impact of palm oil

Neste Journey to Zero Stories

3 things you need to know about chemically recycled plastics
Future of aviation, COVID-19 and the promise of sustainability
Fighting transport poverty – how societies can increase social mobility

References

External links

 
Oil companies of Finland
Automotive fuel retailers
Biodiesel producers
Palm oil
Companies based in Espoo
Energy companies established in 1948
Non-renewable resource companies established in 1948
Renewable resource companies established in 1948
Companies listed on Nasdaq Helsinki
Finnish brands
Finnish companies established in 1948
1948 establishments in Finland